The 2013 Santosh Trophy was the 67th edition of the Santosh Trophy, the main state competition in Indian football. The tournament this season was held from 1 February to 3 March 2013 in Uttar Pradesh and Kerala.

Services won the title defeating Kerala in the final at Jawaharlal Nehru Stadium, Kochi, Kerala.

Teams

In this tournament, 31 state teams from India will be participating.

Group stage proper

Group A

Group B

Group C

Group D

Semi-final

Final

Top scorers

References

 
Santosh Trophy seasons
2012–13 domestic association football cups